İbrahim Şahin (born 1 March 1984) is a Turkish professional footballer who plays as a forward for Gaziosmanpaşaspor.

References

External links
Profile at turkcellsuperlig.com 
Player Profile at TFF.org 
Guardian Stats Centre

1984 births
Living people
Turkish footballers
Süper Lig players
Erzurumspor footballers
Akçaabat Sebatspor footballers
Arsinspor footballers
Hacettepe S.K. footballers
Sivasspor footballers
Orduspor footballers
Göztepe S.K. footballers
Turkey youth international footballers
People from Araklı
Association football forwards